Dandridge McRae (October 10, 1829 – April 23, 1899) was an American  lawyer, court official, and Inspector General of Arkansas State Troops, as well as a brigadier general in the Confederate States Army during the American Civil War. He served in several key battles that helped secure Arkansas for the Confederacy, prolonging the war in the Western Theater.

Biography

Dandridge McRae was born in Baldwin County, Alabama, the son of Margaret (Bracy) and D. R. W. McRae. He graduated in 1849 from South Carolina College, where he was a member of the Euphradian Society and the Corps of Cadets.  McRae moved to Searcy in White County, Arkansas. He was admitted to the bar and served as clerk of the county and circuit courts for six years.

McRae began his military service in Arkansas on September 12, 1860, when he was commissioned as the captain of a volunteer militia company named the "Arkansas Guards" in the 21st Arkansas Militia Regiment, of White County.  He led this company as part of the militia forces which seized the Federal Arsenal at Little Rock in early February, 1861.  After the arsenal seizure, McRae returned to White County and organized a volunteer cavalry troop, the Border Rangers, in Searcy, Arkansas, in April 1861, where he was elected and served as captain.  McRae had also been appointed by Governor Henry Massey Rector to serve as the inspector general of the new Arkansas State Troops.  McRae was first sent to Camp Rector at Hopefield, (near modern-day West Memphis, Arkansas) to begin the mustering in of troops.  During this time McRae is occasionally referenced by other militia commanders as General McRae, probably in connection with his role as inspector general.  McRae left Hopefield shortly after the Arkansas State secession convention dispatched a political general, Thomas H. Bradley of Crittenden County, to assume command.  McRae was next dispatched to Northwest Arkansas to assist Brigadier General Nicholas Bartlett Pearce in the mustering of Arkansas State Troops in the Western Division of the Provisional Army of Arkansas.

McRae was elected as lieutenant colonel in command of the 3rd Arkansas Infantry Battalion on 15 July 1861.  He led his battalion in action at the Battle of Wilson’s Creek, Missouri, on 10 August 1861 and was commended for his coolness under fire and his leadership of his soldiers. In December 1861 Colonel McRae’s battalion was augmented with additional volunteer infantry companies and reorganized into the 15th Arkansas Infantry Regiment (Northwest), and he was promoted to colonel. The regiment was transferred to Missouri under the command of the Army of the West, but, shortly after the transfer, Colonel McRae was granted a transfer back to his adopted state to take command of the then forming 28th Arkansas Infantry Regiment.

McRae took part in the Battle of Pea Ridge in March 1862 and received commendations from his commander, Earl Van Dorn.  McRae remained in Arkansas while most troops were moved eastward across the Mississippi River and participated in operations there.  On November 5, 1862, he was commissioned as a brigadier general.

In 1863, McRae and his command took part in the Battle of Helena in a failed effort to secure that river port for the Confederacy. After the battle there were many accusations as to the causes for the failure of the attack. Two officers were brought up on formal charges of misbehavior before the enemy. Most notably, Brigadier General McRae was accused by Brigadier General Fagan of willful failure to provide assistance during the attack on the Graveyard Hill. On 29 December 1864 a court of inquiry found that Brigadier General McRae was not guilty of any misconduct before the enemy, by order of General E. Kirby Smith.

During the Camden Expedition of the 1864 Red River Campaign, McRae's brigade formed part of the force under General Sterling Price. They participated in the Battle of Marks' Mills and the Battle of Jenkins' Ferry, forcing the Union forces out of southern Arkansas and back to Little Rock. McRae then led his brigade in battles in northern Arkansas and in Missouri later that year until he resigned his commission.

After leaving the service, McRae returned to Searcy and took up the practice of law. Along with future three-term Arkansas Secretary of State Jacob Frolich, McRae headed the White County chapter of the Ku Klux Klan during Reconstruction. Both Frolich and McRae were part of a group of men indicted for the 1868 murder of Albert Parker, an agent of Gov. Powell Clayton sent to investigate KKK activity in White County. Though the charges were ultimately dropped, both men fled Searcy upon warrants being issued for their arrest. McRae took shelter with a friend in neighboring Woodruff County, while Frolich fled to Canada. In 1881, McRae was elected as the deputy secretary of state, serving under Secretary of State Jacob Frolich. He focused his post-war activities on promoting the commercial interests of the State of Arkansas. He was a delegate to various commercial expositions and served as president of the bureau of information for Arkansas.

After suffering a stroke in 1897, McRae began to decline physically. He died on April 23, 1899, at Searcy, Arkansas, where he is buried.

See also

 List of American Civil War generals (Confederate)
 Arkansas in the American Civil War
 List of Arkansas Civil War Confederate units
 Arkansas Militia in the Civil War

Notes

External links 
 Dandridge McRae at FindAGrave.com

References
 Arkansas Military Department Records, List of Commissioned Officers in State Militia 1827–1862, Microfilm Roll 00000038-8, Page 349.
 Eicher, John H., and David J. Eicher, Civil War High Commands. Stanford: Stanford University Press, 2001. .
 Price, Jeffery R. "A Courage And Desperation Rarely Equaled: The 36th Arkansas Infantry Regiment (Confederate States Army), 26 June 1862–25 May 1865". MA thesis, U.S. Army Command and General Staff College, Fort Leavenworth, Kansas, 2003.
 Sifakis, Stewart. Who Was Who in the Civil War. New York: Facts On File, 1988. .
 Thompson, Alan. "Dandridge McRae (1829–1899)", Encyclopedia of Arkansas History and Culture, Retrieved April 27, 2012.
 United States National Archives and Records Service, The War of the Rebellion: A Compilation of the Official Records of the Union and Confederate Armies, Series 1, Volume 22, Part 1, General Order 100.
 Warner, Ezra J. Generals in Gray: Lives of the Confederate Commanders. Baton Rouge: Louisiana State University Press, 1959. .

1829 births
1899 deaths
Confederate States Army brigadier generals
People from Baldwin County, Alabama
People from Searcy, Arkansas
People of Arkansas in the American Civil War
University of South Carolina alumni
American Ku Klux Klan members